Marion Fiack (born 13 October 1992 in Reims) is a French athlete, a specialist in the Pole vault. She holds the France record for this discipline with a vault of 4.71 m.  She also holds the French junior record and French Under 23s record with vaults respectively of 4.36 m and 4.61 m.

Biographie

Youth 
Born at Reims into a family of athletes, including a grandfather who played professional basketball, Marion Fiack was, at first, primarily dedicated to the middle distance and combined events.

First coached by Joël Mertz at Thionville, she won her first cap for France in 2009, at the European Youth Olympic Festival at Tampere.  In 2010, she vaulted for the first time over 4 m in the pole vault by performing a vault of 4.12 m at Forbach, which was a regional record. She qualified for the 2010 World Junior Championships in Athletics at Moncton, but did not proceed past the qualifying rounds.

In 2011, she left Lorraine to settle in Clermont-Ferrand. Trained by Philippe EncausseIt, she beat, on 10   December   2011, the French junior record with a vault of 4.36m in a competition won by the British woman,  Holly Bradshaw, in front of Vanessa Boslak, who held the previous record.

Under 23s 
Competing in the Senior level competition, Marion Fiack became  Indoors 2013 vice-champion of France with a vault of 4.35 meters, being beaten that day by Marion Lotout.  Outdoors, she placed  5th in  Under 23s European Championships at Tampere.

She started the 2014 season with a personal best of 4.51 m at Aubière. On 18   January   2014 at Orleans,  Marion Fiack vaulted 4.61 m, improving the French Under 23 record, and temporarily seizing the best world performance of the year tied with the British Holly Bradshaw.  In February she was again vice-champion of France behind Marion Lotout (4.51 m against 4.56 m).

She continued, outdoors, with a victory at Pézenas in late May by vaulting 4.55 m.  At the French championships she took second place, beaten by Vanessa Boslak. At the European Championships from Zurich, she failed to reach the final, having to settle for 4.35 m.

2015 season    : France Senior record 
On 10 January 2015 at Aubière, she improved 10 cm to clear  4.71 m. This thus beats the France record formerly held by Vanessa Boslak (4.70 m since 28 June 2006) and seized temporarily the best world performance of the year. Her Indoor season  is successful winning  the champion of France title at Aubiere where she vaulted 4.60 m. She managed the same performance in early March at European Indoor Championships, Enabling her to qualify for the final where she will repeat this performance (5th with 4.50 m).

Spending some time in the United States in order to prepare for the summer season, she injured her hand.  She cannot return to her best and must end this season, which deprives her of the chance to participate in the World Championships.

2016 : retour 
A little lack of confidence, Marion returned to competition at the meeting at Orleans with only a vault of 4.13 m. The following week, she managed  4.38 m at Rouen where she took fourth in the competition.

Prize list

Records

Notes and references

External links  
 
 profile Marion Fiack on the site of the French Athletics Federation

1992 births
Living people
French female pole vaulters
Sportspeople from Reims